Eid Church or Eide Church may refer:

Churches in Norway
 Eid Church (Kvinnherad), in Kvinnherad municipality in Vestland county
 Eid Church (Nordfjord), in Stad municipality in Vestland county
 Eid Church (Rauma), in Rauma municipality in Møre og Romsdal county
 Eide Church, in Hustadvika municipality in Møre og Romsdal county
 Eide Church (Agder), in Grimstad municipality in Agder county